Aïn Beida Harriche District is a district of Mila Province, Algeria.

The district is further divided into 2 municipalities:
Aïn Beida Harriche
Elayadi Barbes

Districts of Mila Province